"Sugbo", also known as the Sugbo Hymn, is the official hymn of the province of Cebu in the Philippines.

History 
The hymn was composed by Dr. Susana Cabahug and Rogelio Serna, and arranged by Angel Cabilao. It was adopted by the Cebu Provincial Board with the passage of Provincial Ordinance No. 2006–10 on October 2, 2006.

In 2010, then Provincial Board member Julian Daan proposed and was able to secure the approval of a resolution mandating public elementary and high schools within the province to sing the hymn after the Philippine national anthem during the flag ceremony. Daan observed that despite the passage of the said ordinance in 2006, its implementation was not strictly followed. It was also proposed by Provincial Board member Miguel Antonio Magpale in 2015 to promote the singing of the hymn in official functions, gatherings and activities of the province's local government units to "strengthen the sense of community among the province's residents."

On August 6, 2019, the hymn was used during the raising of the provincial flag along with the flags of its towns and cities on the occasion of the province's 450th founding anniversary led by Governor Gwendolyn Garcia together with provincial officials, police and military officials, Cebu City vice mayor Michael Rama and Davao City mayor Sara Duterte.

Lyrics

See also
"Mabuhi!", the signature song of Gwendolyn Garcia and described as the "anthem" of her administration

References

External links 
, 2021 video produced during the governorship of Gwendolyn Garcia
, 2019 video produced during the governorship of Hilario Davide III

Regional songs
Culture of Cebu
Asian anthems
Philippine anthems
National anthem compositions in A-flat major